Tears of Stone may refer to:
Tears of Stone (album), Irish folk album by The Chieftains
Tears of Stone (film), Icelandic film